Serigne Saliou Mbacké (Wolof: Sëriñ Saaliwu Mbàkke; September 22, 1915 – December 28, 2007) was a saint (Wali) and Grand Marabout (leader) of the Mouride movement in Senegal from 1990 until his death in 2007.

Sheikh Salih Mbacké was the fifth caliph (leader) of Mouridism and the last surviving son of Cheikh Ahmadou Bamba, the founder of the Mouride movement.

Life
As Sheikh, he was credited for his transformation of the village of Touba into Senegal's second largest city.

Mbacké was a pious leader and served as the lead example for the millions of followers (talibés) of the Mouride Islamic movement and made many improvements to the more than 400 Islamic schools founded by himself as well as his siblings, most notably Serigne Mourtalla Mbacke. He also made many improvements to the holy city of Touba, such as covering Grand Mosque of Touba with Italian marble.

Agriculture and religious education were his main occupations. The Daaras (religious schools) that he founded, where the students work in the field, are found all over Senegal. With the majority being found in Khelcom in the center of the country near Kaolack.

He died at the age of 92 on December 28, 2007, and was buried in Touba the next day; a three-day mourning period was declared in Senegal, his home country. He was succeeded by his nephew, Serigne Mouhamadou Lamine Bara Mbacké, the son of Cheikh Fallou Macke.

References

External links
 Obituary in The Times, 2 January 2007

Mouride caliphs
Islam in Senegal
1915 births
People of French West Africa
2007 deaths